Witteveen is a hamlet in the Drenthe municipality of De Wolden, the Netherlands. Witteveen lies north of Ruinen on the edge of the Dwingelderveld National Park. It is considered a part of Ruinen, and has about 15 houses and 2 bungalow parks.

References 

Populated places in Drenthe
De Wolden